Don 'Da Bomb' George (born Donovan Peter George) is a professional boxer who currently competes in the super middleweight division. He is a former USBA champion and currently resides in Chicago, Illinois. He is the former IBO Super Middleweight Champion.His professional record is 25-4-2 with 22 KO's.

Don is a three time Chicago Golden Gloves Champion from 2001-2003 and is trained by father and Illinois Boxing Hall of Famer Peter George. Don won the IBO championship on August 23, 2014 at Chicago's US Cellular Field but it was stripped away for having a positive drug test. He had some past family issues with his sister

External links
http://boxrec.com/list_bouts.php?human_id=267736&cat=boxer
http://www.eastsideboxing.com/2014/pro-boxing-returns-to-u-s-cellular-field-saturday-august-23rd/

Year of birth missing (living people)
Living people
Super-middleweight boxers

American male boxers